is a bus rapid transit line in Nagoya, Aichi, Japan. The line is officially called . As such, the name is also unofficially spelt Yutreet Line. The line is owned by Nagoya Guideway Bus Company, whose name is also often used as the alternative name for the line. The whole line opened on March 23, 2001.

Overview
The line consists of the guided bus segment on a viaduct dedicated track in central Nagoya and the ordinary bus segment on public road. Vehicles go directly between the two segments. The guided bus segment runs between Ōzone, Higashi Ward and Obata Ryokuchi, Moriyama Ward. Nagoya Guideway Bus manages the guideway facilities and cars, while Nagoya Municipal Bus operates buses on the line. This is the only guided bus line in Japan. The line is legally considered as a sort of railway, like monorails or automated guideway transits in the country.

Originally Meitetsu Bus and JR Central Bus also operated buses on the line. The two operators withdrew from the line on October 1, 2009.

Basic data
The data below is about the guided bus segment.
Distance: 
Stations: 9
Double-track line: Whole line
Motive energy: Internal combustion engine

Routes
There are 4 routes operated, each on different normal bus segments.
Ōzone — Obata Ryokuchi
Ōzone — Obata Ryokuchi — Nakashidami
Ōzone — Obata Ryokuchi — Shidami Science Park — Nakashidami
Ōzone — Obata Ryokuchi — Kōzōji

Stations 
The data below is about the guided bus segment.

See also
Guided bus
Bus rapid transit
List of railway lines in Japan

External links 
  Nagoya Guideway Bus official website
 
 

2001 establishments in Japan
Bus companies of Japan
Bus rapid transit in Japan
Transport in Nagoya
Elevated bus rapid transit